San Leonardo al Lago is a Roman Catholic church in the neighborhood of Santa Colomba, within the municipal limits of Monteriggioni, a few kilometers outside of Siena, region of Tuscany, Italy.

History
The church was originally documented as an Augustinian hermitage in 1119, located near the Lake Verano, now known a Pian del Lago. An abbey was established over the next centuries. The church underwent reconstruction during 13th and 14th centuries, gaining a style transitioning between romanesque and gothic. In 1366, the convent was fortified to protect against raiding armies. The tall stone facade has a round oculus but a rounded arch portal. The lateral walls have few but narrow windows.

The church apse contains frescoes depicting the Life of the Virgin (1360-1370) by Lippo Vanni. The refectory contains remains of a fresco depicting the Crucifixion (1445) by Giovanni di Paolo del Grazia.

References

Churches in the province of Siena
Romanesque architecture in Tuscany
Gothic architecture in Tuscany
Roman Catholic churches in Tuscany
Buildings and structures in Monteriggioni